A cyberattack is any offensive maneuver that targets computer information systems, computer networks, infrastructures, personal computer devices,  or smartphones. An attacker is a person or process that attempts to access data, functions, or other restricted areas of the system without authorization, potentially with malicious intent. Depending on the context, cyberattacks can be part of cyber warfare or cyberterrorism. A cyberattack can be employed by sovereign states, individuals, groups, societies or organisations and it may originate from an anonymous source. A product that facilitates a cyberattack is sometimes called a cyber weapon. Cyber attacks have increased with an alarming rate for the last few years. A well-known example of a cyberattack is a distributed denial of service attack (DDoS).

A cyberattack may steal, alter, or destroy a specified target by hacking into a susceptible system. Cyberattacks can range from installing spyware on a personal computer to attempting to destroy the infrastructure of entire nations. Legal experts are seeking to limit the use of the term to incidents causing physical damage, distinguishing it from the more routine data breaches and broader hacking activities.

Cyberattacks have become increasingly sophisticated and dangerous.

User behavior analytics and Security Information and Event Management (SIEM) can be used to help prevent these attacks.

Definitions 

Since the late 1980s cyberattacks have evolved several times to use innovations in information technology as vectors for committing cybercrimes. In recent years, the scale and robustness of cyberattacks have increased rapidly, as observed by the World Economic Forum in its 2018 report: "Offensive cyber capabilities are developing more rapidly than our ability to deal with hostile incidents".

In May 2000, the Internet Engineering Task Force defined attack in RFC 2828 as:

an assault on system security that derives from an intelligent threat, i.e., an intelligent act that is a deliberate attempt (especially in the sense of a method or technique) to evade security services and violate the security policy of a system.

CNSS Instruction No. 4009 dated 26 April 2010 by Committee on National Security Systems of the United States of America  defines an attack as:

Any kind of malicious activity that attempts to collect, disrupt, deny, degrade, or destroy information system resources or the information itself.

The increasing dependency of modern society on information and computer networks (both in private and public sectors, including the military) has led to new terms like cyber attack and cyber warfare.

CNSS Instruction No. 4009 define a cyber attack as:

An attack, via cyberspace, targets an enterprise’s use of cyberspace for the purpose of disrupting, disabling, destroying, or maliciously controlling a computing environment/infrastructure; or destroying the integrity of the data or stealing controlled information.

As cars begin to adopt more technology, cyber attacks are becoming a security threat to automobiles.

Prevalence 
In the first six months of 2017, two billion data records were stolen or impacted by cyber attacks, and ransomware payments reached , double that in 2016. In 2020, with the increase of remote work as an effect of the COVID-19 global pandemic, cybersecurity statistics reveal a huge increase in hacked and breached data. The worldwide information security market is forecast to reach $170.4 billion in 2022.

Cyber warfare and cyberterrorism 

Cyberwarfare utilizes techniques of defending and attacking information and computer networks that inhabit cyberspace, often through a prolonged cyber campaign or series of related campaigns. It denies an opponent's ability to do the same while employing technological instruments of war to attack an opponent's critical computer systems. Cyberterrorism, on the other hand, is "the use of computer network tools to shut down critical national infrastructures (such as energy, transportation, government operations) or to coerce or intimidate a government or civilian population". That means the result of both cyberwarfare and cyberterrorism is the same, to damage critical infrastructures and computer systems linked together within the confines of cyberspace.

The financial crime expert Veit Buetterlin explained that organizations, including state actors, which cannot finance themselves through trade because of imposed sanctions, conduct cyber attacks on banks to generate funds.

Factors 

Three factors contribute to why cyberattacks are launched against a state or an individual: the fear factor, the spectacularity factor, and the vulnerability factor.

Spectacularity factor 
The spectacularity factor is a measure of the actual damage achieved by an attack, meaning that the attack creates direct losses (usual loss of availability or loss of income) and garners negative publicity. On 8 February 2000, a Denial of Service attack severely reduced traffic to many major sites, including Amazon, Buy.com, CNN, and eBay (the attack continued to affect still other sites the next day). Amazon reportedly estimated the loss of business at $600,000.

Vulnerability factor 
The vulnerability factor exploits how vulnerable an organization or government establishment is to cyberattacks. Organizations without maintenance systems might be running on old servers which are more vulnerable than updated systems. An organization can be vulnerable to a denial of service attack and a government establishment can be defaced on a web page. A computer network attack disrupts the integrity or authenticity of data, usually through malicious code that alters program logic that controls data, leading to errors in the output.

Professional hackers to cyberterrorists 

Professional hackers, either working on their own or employed by government agencies or the military, can find computer systems with vulnerabilities lacking the appropriate security software. Once those vulnerabilities are found, they can infect systems with malicious code and then remotely control the system or computer by sending commands to view content or to disrupt other computers. There needs to be a pre-existing system flaw within the computer such as no antivirus protection or faulty system configuration for the viral code to work.

Many professional hackers will promote themselves to cyber terrorists, for financial gain or other reasons. This means a new set of rules govern their actions. Cyberterrorists have premeditated plans and their attacks are not born of rage. They need to develop their plans step-by-step and acquire the appropriate software to carry out an attack. They usually have political agendas, targeting political structures. Cyberterrorists are hackers with a political motivation, their attacks can impact political structure through this corruption and destruction.  They also target civilians, civilian interests, and civilian installations. As previously stated, cyberterrorists attack persons or property and cause enough harm to generate fear.

Types of attack 
An attack can be active or passive.

 An "active attack" attempts to alter system resources or affect their operation.
 A "passive attack" attempts to learn or make use of information from the system but does not affect system resources (e.g., wiretapping).
An attack can be perpetrated by an insider or from outside the organization;
 An "inside attack" is an attack initiated by an entity inside the security perimeter (an "insider"), i.e., an entity that is authorized to access system resources but uses them in a way not approved by those who granted the authorization.
 An "outside attack" is initiated from outside the perimeter, by an unauthorized or illegitimate user of the system (an "outsider"). In the Internet, potential outside attackers range from amateur pranksters to organized criminals, international terrorists, and hostile governments.
 

A resource (both physical or logical), called an asset, can have one or more vulnerabilities that can be exploited by a threat agent in a threat action. As a result, the confidentiality, integrity or availability of resources may be compromised. Potentially, the damage may extend to resources in addition to the one initially identified as vulnerable, including further resources of the organization, and the resources of other involved parties (customers, suppliers).

The so-called CIA triad is the basis of information security.

The attack can be active when it attempts to alter system resources or affect their operation: so it compromises integrity or availability. A "passive attack" attempts to learn or make use of information from the system but does not affect system resources: so it compromises confidentiality.

A threat is a potential for violation of security, which exists when there is a circumstance, capability, action or event that could breach security and cause harm. That is, a threat is a possible danger that might exploit a vulnerability. A threat can be either "intentional" (i.e., intelligent; e.g., an individual cracker or a criminal organization) or "accidental" (e.g., the possibility of a computer malfunctioning, or the possibility of an "act of God" such as an earthquake, a fire, or a tornado).

A set of policies concerned with information security management, the information security management systems (ISMS), has been developed to manage, according to risk management principles, the countermeasures in order to accomplish to a security strategy set up following rules and regulations applicable in a country.

An attack should lead to a security incident i.e. a security event that involves a security violation. In other words, a security-relevant system event in which the system's security policy is disobeyed or otherwise breached.

The overall picture represents the risk factors of the risk scenario.

An organization should take steps to detect, classify and manage security incidents. The first logical step is to set up an incident response plan and eventually a computer emergency response team.

In order to detect attacks, a number of countermeasures can be set up at organizational, procedural, and technical levels. Computer emergency response team, information technology security audit and intrusion detection system are examples of these.

An attack usually is perpetrated by someone with bad intentions: black hatted attacks falls in this category, while other perform penetration testing on an organization information system to find out if all foreseen controls are in place.

The attacks can be classified according to their origin: i.e. if it is conducted using one or more computers: in the last case is called a distributed attack. Botnets are used to conduct distributed attacks.

Other classifications are according to the procedures used or the type of vulnerabilities exploited: attacks can be concentrated on network mechanisms or host features.

Some attacks are physical: i.e. theft or damage of computers and other equipment. Others are attempts to force changes in the logic used by computers or network protocols in order to achieve unforeseen (by the original designer) result but useful for the attacker. Software used to for logical attacks on computers is called malware.

The following is a partial short list of attacks:
 Passive
 Computer and network surveillance
 Network
 Wiretapping
 Fiber tapping
 Port scan
 Idle scan
 Host
 Keystroke logging
 Data scraping
 Backdoor
 Active
 Denial-of-service attack
 DDos or Distributed Denial of service attack is an attempt made by the hacker to block access to a server or a website that is connected to the Internet. This is achieved using multiple computerized systems, which overloads the target system with requests, making it incapable of responding to any query.
 Spoofing
 Mixed threat attack
 Network
 Man-in-the-middle
 Man-in-the-browser
 ARP poisoning
 Ping flood
 Ping of death
 Smurf attack
 Host
 Buffer overflow
 Heap overflow
 Stack overflow
 Format string attack
 By modality
 Supply chain attack
 Social engineering
 Exploit

In detail, there are a number of techniques to utilize in cyberattacks and a variety of ways to administer them to individuals or establishments on a broader scale. Attacks are broken down into two categories: syntactic attacks and semantic attacks. Syntactic attacks are straightforward; it is considered malicious software which includes viruses, worms, and Trojan horses.

Syntactic attacks

Viruses 

A virus is a self-replicating program that can attach itself to another program or file in order to reproduce. The virus can hide in unlikely locations in the memory of a computer system and attach itself to whatever file it sees fit to execute its code. It can also change its digital footprint each time it replicates making it harder to track down in the computer.

Worms 

A worm does not need another file or program to copy itself; it is a self-sustaining running program. Worms replicate over a network using protocols. The latest incarnation of worms make use of known vulnerabilities in systems to penetrate, execute their code, and replicate to other systems such as the Code Red II worm that infected more than 259 000 systems in less than 14 hours. On a much larger scale, worms can be designed for industrial espionage to monitor and collect server and traffic activities then transmit it back to its creator.

Trojan horses 

A Trojan horse is designed to perform legitimate tasks but it also performs unknown and unwanted activity. It can be the basis of many viruses and worms installing onto the computer as keyboard loggers and backdoor software. In a commercial sense, Trojans can be imbedded in trial versions of software and can gather additional intelligence about the target without the person even knowing it happening. All three of these are likely to attack an individual and establishment through emails, web browsers, chat clients, remote software, and updates.

Semantic attacks 
Semantic attack is the modification and dissemination of correct and incorrect information. Information modified could have been done without the use of computers even though new opportunities can be found by using them. To set someone in the wrong direction or to cover your tracks, the dissemination of incorrect information can be utilized.

Cyberattacks by and against countries 
Within cyberwarfare, the individual must recognize the state actors involved in committing these cyberattacks against one another. The two predominant players that will be discussed is the age-old comparison of East versus West, China's cyber capabilities compared to United States' capabilities. There are many other state and non-state actors involved in cyberwarfare, such as Russia, Iran, Iraq, and Al Qaeda; since China and the U.S. are leading the foreground in cyberwarfare capabilities, they will be the only two states actors discussed.

But in Q2 2013, Akamai Technologies reported that Indonesia toppled China with a portion 38 percent of cyber attacks, a high increase from the 21 percent portion in the previous quarter. China set 33 percent and the US set at 6.9 percent. 79 percent of attacks came from the Asia Pacific region. Indonesia dominated the attacking to ports 80 and 443 by about 90 percent.

Azerbaijan 
Hackers from Azerbaijan and Armenia have actively participated in cyberwarfare as part of the Nagorno-Karabakh conflicyber warfare over the disputed region of Nagorno-Karabakh, with Azerbaijani hackers targeting Armenian websites and posting Ilham Aliyev's statements.

Canada 
"Chinese state-sponsored actor" attacked a research facility in Canada in 2011. Unknown hackers attacked Canada's foreign ministry in 2022.

China 

China's People's Liberation Army (PLA) has developed a strategy called "Integrated Network Electronic Warfare" which guides computer network operations and cyberwarfare tools. This strategy helps link together network warfare tools and electronic warfare weapons against an opponent's information systems during the conflict. They believe the fundamentals for achieving success is about seizing control of an opponent's information flow and establishing information dominance. The Science of Military and The Science of Campaigns both identify enemy logistics systems networks as the highest priority for cyberattacks and states that cyberwarfare must mark the start of a campaign, used properly, can enable overall operational success. Focusing on attacking the opponent's infrastructure to disrupt transmissions and processes of information that dictate decision-making operations, the PLA would secure cyber dominance over their adversary. The predominant techniques that would be utilized during a conflict to gain the upper hand are as follows, the PLA would strike with electronic jammers, electronic deception, and suppression techniques to interrupt the transfer processes of information. They would launch virus attacks or hacking techniques to sabotage information processes, all in the hopes of destroying enemy information platforms and facilities. The PLA's Science of Campaigns noted that one role for cyberwarfare is to create windows of opportunity for other forces to operate without detection or with a lowered risk of counterattack by exploiting the enemy's periods of "blindness", "deafness" or "paralysis" created by cyberattacks. That is one of the main focal points of cyberwarfare, to be able to weaken your enemy to the full extent possible so that your physical offensive will have a higher percentage of success.

The PLA conducts regular training exercises in a variety of environments emphasizing the use of cyberwarfare tactics and techniques in countering such tactics if it is employed against them.  Faculty research has been focusing on designs for rootkit usage and detection for their Kylin Operating System which helps to further train these individuals' cyberwarfare techniques. China perceives cyber warfare as a deterrent to nuclear weapons, possessing the ability for greater precision, leaving fewer casualties, and allowing for long-ranged attacks.

On March 2, 2021, Microsoft released an emergency security update to patch four security vulnerabilities that had been used by Hafnium, a Chinese nation-state-sponsored hacking group that had compromised at least 30,000 public and private Microsoft exchange servers.

Estonia 

The 2007 cyberattacks on Estonia were a series of cyberattacks that began on 27 April 2007 and targeted websites of Estonian organizations, including Estonian parliament, banks, ministries, newspapers, and broadcasters, amid the country's disagreement with Russia about the relocation of the Bronze Soldier of Tallinn, an elaborate Soviet-era grave marker, as well as war graves in Tallinn. The attacks triggered a number of military organizations around the world to reconsider the importance of network security to modern military doctrine. The direct result of the cyberattacks was the creation of the NATO Cooperative Cyber Defence Centre of Excellence in Tallinn.

Ethiopia 
In an extension of a bilateral dispute between Ethiopia and Egypt over the Grand Ethiopian Renaissance Dam, Ethiopian government websites have been hacked by the Egypt-based hackers in June 2020.

India and Pakistan 

There were two such instances between India and Pakistan that involved cyberspace conflicts, started in 1990s. Earlier cyber attacks came to known as early as in 1999. Since then, India and Pakistan were engaged in a long-term dispute over Kashmir which moved into cyberspace. Historical accounts indicated that each country's hackers have been repeatedly involved in attacking each other's computing database system. The number of attacks has grown yearly: 45 in 1999, 133 in 2000, 275 by the end of August 2001. In 2010, Indian hackers laid a cyber attack at least 36 government database websites going by the name "Indian Cyber Army". In 2013, Indian hackers hacked the official website of Election Commission of Pakistan in an attempt to retrieve sensitive database information. In retaliation, Pakistani hackers, calling themselves "True Cyber Army" hacked and defaced ~1,059 websites of Indian election bodies.

In 2013, India's Ministry of Electronics and Information Technology (MeitY) which was then known as Department of Electronics and Information Technology (DeitY), unveiled a cybersecurity policy framework called National Cyber Security Policy 2013 which officially came into effect on July 1, 2013.

According to the media, Pakistan's has been working on effective cyber security system, in a program called the "Cyber Secure Pakistan" (CSP).  The program was launched in April 2013 by Pakistan Information Security Association and the program has expanded to country's universities.

In 2020, according to the Media reports, Pakistan Army confirms the series of Cyber Attacks that has been identified on Pakistani Government and private websites by the Indian Intelligence. ISPR also advised the government and private institutions to enhance cyber security measures.

Iran 
On 8 February 2020, the telecommunication network of Iran witnessed extensive disruptions at 11:44 a.m. local time, which lasted for about an hour. The Ministry of Information and Communications Technology of Iran confirmed it as a Distributed Denial of Service (DDoS) attack. The Iranian authorities activated the "Digital Fortress" cyber-defense mechanism to repel. Also known as DZHAFA, it led to a drop of 75 percent in the national internet connectivity.

On the noon of 26 October 2021, A cyberattack caused all 4,300 fuel stations in Iran to disrupt and disable government-issued cards for buying subsidized fuel. This cyberattack also caused digital billboards to display messages against the Iranian government.

Ireland 

On 14 May 2021, the Health Service Executive (HSE) of Ireland suffered a major ransomware cyberattack which caused all of its IT systems nationwide to be shut down.

It was the most significant cybercrime attack on an Irish state agency and the largest known attack against a health service computer system. The group responsible was identified as a criminal gang known as Wizard Spider, believed to be operating from Russia. The same group is believed to have attacked Ireland's Department of Health with a similar cyberattack.

Israel 
In April 2020, there were attempts to hack into Israel's water infrastructure of the Sharon central region by Iran, which was thwarted by Israeli cyber defenses. The cyberattack intended to introduce dangerous levels of chlorine into the Israeli water supply.

North Korea

Norway 
In August 2020 the Norwegian parliament Stortinget suffered a cyberattack on the email system belonging to several officials. In December 2020, the Norwegian Police Security Service said the likely perpetrators were the Russian cyber espionage group Fancy Bear.

Russia 
During the 2018 FIFA World Cup, Russia countered and stopped around 25 million cyber-attacks on IT Infrastructure.

In June 2019, Russia has conceded that it is "possible" its electrical grid is under cyberattack by the United States. The New York Times reported that American hackers from the United States Cyber Command planted malware potentially capable of disrupting the Russian electrical grid.

On 19 October 2020, the US justice department charged six Russian military officers of a worldwide hacking campaign, which attacked targets like French election, the 2018 Winter Olympic Games opening ceremony, US businesses and Ukraine's electricity grid. The campaign was believed to have cost billions of dollars for the mass disruption it caused.

Ukraine 

A series of powerful cyberattacks began 27 June, 2017, that swamped websites of Ukrainian organizations, including banks, ministries, newspapers and electricity firms. In January 2022, Microsoft disclosed activity of a ransomware and DoS attack on various government agencies and organizations.

United Arab Emirates 
In 2019, Reuters reported that United Arab Emirates launched a series of cyberattacks on its political opponents, journalists, and human rights activists under Project Raven, on an espionage platform namely Karma. The team included ex-US intelligence agents. Project Raven commenced in 2009 and was planned to be continued for the coming ten years.

United Arab Emirates, used and asked for help from couple of countries providing their best calibres to overcome this crisis, and to confine the damage and consequences upon Project Raven, and indeed big names did participate to help like the American master, Graham Dexter, and the Egyptian phenomenal name in cybersecurity, Elhamy Elsebaey.

United States 

In the west, the United States provides a different "tone of voice" when cyberwarfare is on the tip of everyone's tongue. The United States provides security plans strictly in the response to cyberwarfare, basically going on the defensive when they are being attacked by devious cyber methods. In the U.S., the responsibility of cybersecurity is divided between the Department of Homeland Security, the Federal Bureau of Investigation, and the Department of Defense. In recent years, a new department was created to specifically tend to cyber threats, this department is known as Cyber Command. Cyber Command is a military subcommand under US Strategic Command and is responsible for dealing with threats to the military cyber infrastructure. Cyber Command's service elements include Army Forces Cyber Command, the Twenty-Fourth Air Force, Fleet Cyber Command and Marine Forces Cyber Command. It ensures that the President can navigate and control information systems and that he also has military options available when defense of the nation needs to be enacted in cyberspace. Individuals at Cyber Command must pay attention to state and non-state actors who are developing cyberwarfare capabilities in conducting cyber espionage and other cyberattacks against the nation and its allies. Cyber Command seeks to be a deterrence factor to dissuade potential adversaries from attacking the U.S., while being a multi-faceted department in conducting cyber operations of its own.

Three prominent events took place which may have been catalysts in the creation of the idea of Cyber Command. There was a failure of critical infrastructure reported by the CIA where malicious activities against information technology systems disrupted electrical power capabilities overseas. This resulted in multi-city power outages across multiple regions. The second event was the exploitation of global financial services. In November 2008, an international bank had a compromised payment processor that allowed fraudulent transactions to be made at more than 130 automated teller machines in 49 cities within a 30-minute period. The last event was the systemic loss of U.S. economic value when an industry in 2008 estimated $1 trillion in losses of intellectual property to data theft. Even though all these events were internal catastrophes, they were very real in nature, meaning nothing can stop state or non-state actors to do the same thing on an even grander scale. Other initiatives like the Cyber Training Advisory Council were created to improve the quality, efficiency, and sufficiency of training for computer network defense, attack, and exploitation of enemy cyber operations.

On both ends of the spectrum, East and West nations show a "sword and shield" contrast in ideals. The Chinese have a more offensive minded idea for cyberwarfare, trying to get the pre-emptive strike in the early stages of conflict to gain the upper-hand. In the U.S. there are more reactionary measures being taken at creating systems with impenetrable barriers to protect the nation and its civilians from cyberattacks.

According to Homeland Preparedness News, many mid-sized U.S. companies have a difficult time defending their systems against cyber-attacks. Around 80 percent of assets vulnerable to a cyber-attack are owned by private companies and organizations. Former New York State Deputy Secretary for Public Safety Michael Balboni said that private entities "do not have the type of capability, bandwidth, interest or experience to develop a proactive cyber analysis."

In response to cyberattacks on 1 April 2015, President Obama issued an Executive Order establishing the first-ever economic sanctions. The Executive Order will impact individuals and entities ("designees") responsible for cyber-attacks that threaten the national security, foreign policy, economic health, or financial stability of the US. Specifically, the Executive Order authorizes the Treasury Department to freeze designees' assets.

According to Ted Koppel's book, in 2008, the United States in collaboration with Israel, ran a cyber-attack on Iran's nuclear program, becoming "the first to use a digital weapon as an instrument of policy".

Consequence of a potential attack 

Consequences can include a multitude of direct and indirect effects. In September 2020, media reported of what may be the first publicly confirmed case of a civilian fatality as a nearly direct consequence of a cyberattack, after ransomware disrupted a hospital in Germany.

A whole industry is working to minimize the likelihood and the consequences of a cyberattack.

For a partial list see: Computer security software companies.

Activities, often offered as products and services, may be aimed at:
 Studying all possible attacks category
 Publishing books and articles about the subject
 Discovering vulnerabilities
 Evaluating the risks
 Fixing vulnerabilities
 Inventing, designing and deploying countermeasures
 Setting up a contingency plan in order to be ready to respond

Many organizations are trying to classify vulnerability and their consequences. The most popular vulnerability database is the Common Vulnerabilities and Exposures.

Computer emergency response teams are set up by governments and large organizations to handle computer security incidents.

Infrastructures as targets 
Once a cyberattack has been initiated, there are certain targets that need to be attacked to cripple the opponent. Certain infrastructures as targets have been highlighted as critical infrastructures in times of conflict that can severely cripple a nation. Control systems, energy resources, finance, telecommunications, transportation, and water facilities are seen as critical infrastructure targets during conflict. A new report on the industrial cybersecurity problems, produced by the British Columbia Institute of Technology, and the PA Consulting Group, using data from as far back as 1981, reportedly has found a 10-fold increase in the number of successful cyberattacks on infrastructure Supervisory Control and Data Acquisition (SCADA) systems since 2000. Cyberattacks that have an adverse physical effect are known as cyber-physical attacks.

Control systems 
Control systems are responsible for activating and monitoring industrial or mechanical controls. Many devices are integrated with computer platforms to control valves and gates to certain physical infrastructures. Control systems are usually designed as remote telemetry devices that link to other physical devices through internet access or modems. Little security can be offered when dealing with these devices, enabling many hackers or cyberterrorists to seek out systematic vulnerabilities. Paul Blomgren, manager of sales engineering at cybersecurity firm explained how his people drove to a remote substation, saw a wireless network antenna and immediately plugged in their wireless LAN cards. They took out their laptops and connected to the system because it wasn't using passwords. "Within 10 minutes, they had mapped every piece of equipment in the facility," Blomgren said. "Within 15 minutes, they mapped every piece of equipment in the operational control network. Within 20 minutes, they were talking to the business network and had pulled off several business reports. They never even left the vehicle."

Energy 
Energy is seen as the second infrastructure that could be attacked. It is broken down into two categories, electricity and natural gas. Electricity also known as electric grids power cities, regions, and households; it powers machines and other mechanisms used in day-to-day life. Using US as an example, in a conflict cyberterrorists can access data through the Daily Report of System Status that shows power flows throughout the system and can pinpoint the busiest sections of the grid. By shutting those grids down, they can cause mass hysteria, backlog, and confusion; also being able to locate critical areas of operation to further attacks in a more direct method. Cyberterrorists can access instructions on how to connect to the Bonneville Power Administration which helps direct them on how to not fault the system in the process. This is a major advantage that can be utilized when cyberattacks are being made because foreign attackers with no prior knowledge of the system can attack with the highest accuracy without drawbacks. Cyberattacks on natural gas installations go much the same way as it would with attacks on electrical grids. Cyberterrorists can shutdown these installations stopping the flow or they can even reroute gas flows to another section that can be occupied by one of their allies. There was a case in Russia with a gas supplier known as Gazprom, they lost control of their central switchboard which routes gas flow, after an inside operator and Trojan horse program bypassed security.

The 2021 Colonial Pipeline cyberattack caused a sudden shutdown of the pipeline that carried 45% of the gasoline, diesel, and jet fuel consumed on the East Coast of the United States.

Finance 
Financial infrastructures could be hit hard by cyberattacks as the financial system is linked by computer systems. Money is constantly being exchanged in these institutions and if cyberterrorists were to attack and if transactions were rerouted and large amounts of money stolen, financial industries would collapse and civilians would be without jobs and security. Operations would stall from region to region causing nationwide economic degradation. In the U.S. alone, the average daily volume of transactions hit $3 trillion and 99% of it is non-cash flow. To be able to disrupt that amount of money for one day or for a period of days can cause lasting damage making investors pull out of funding and erode public confidence.

A cyberattack on a financial institution or transactions may be referred to as a cyberheist. These attacks may start with phishing that targets employees, using social engineering to coax information from them. They may allow attackers to hack into the network and put keyloggers on the accounting systems. In time, the cybercriminals are able to obtain password and keys information. An organization's bank accounts can then be accessed via the information they have stolen using the keyloggers. In May 2013, a gang carried out a US$40 million cyberheist from the Bank of Muscat.

Telecommunications 
Cyberattacking telecommunication infrastructures have straightforward results. Telecommunication integration is becoming common practice, systems such as voice and IP networks are merging. Everything is being run through the internet because the speeds and storage capabilities are endless. Denial-of-service attacks can be administered as previously mentioned, but more complex attacks can be made on BGP routing protocols or DNS infrastructures. It is less likely that an attack would target or compromise the traditional telephony network of SS7 switches, or an attempted attack on physical devices such as microwave stations or satellite facilities. The ability would still be there to shut down those physical facilities to disrupt telephony networks. The whole idea on these cyberattacks is to cut people off from one another, to disrupt communication, and by doing so, to impede critical information being sent and received. In cyberwarfare, this is a critical way of gaining the upper hand in a conflict. By controlling the flow of information and communication, a nation can plan more accurate strikes and enact better counter-attack measures on their enemies.

Transportation 
Transportation infrastructure mirrors telecommunication facilities: by impeding transportation for individuals in a city or region, the economy will slightly degrade over time. Successful cyberattacks can impact scheduling and accessibility, creating a disruption in the economic chain. Carrying methods will be impacted, making it hard for cargo to be sent from one place to another. In January 2003 during the "slammer" virus, Continental Airlines was forced to shut down flights due to computer problems. Cyberterrorists can target railroads by disrupting switches, target flight software to impede airplanes, and target road usage to impede more conventional transportation methods. In May 2015, a man, Chris Roberts, who was a cyberconsultant, revealed to the FBI that he had repeatedly, from 2011 to 2014, managed to hack into Boeing and Airbus flights' controls via the onboard entertainment system, allegedly, and had at least once ordered a flight to climb. The FBI, after detaining him in April 2015 in Syracuse, had interviewed him about the allegations.

Water 
Water as an infrastructure could be one of the most critical infrastructures to be attacked. It is seen as one of the greatest security hazards among all of the computer-controlled systems. There is the potential to have massive amounts of water unleashed into an area which could be unprotected causing loss of life and property damage. It is not even water supplies that could be attacked; sewer systems can be compromised too. There was no calculation given to the cost of damages, but the estimated cost to replace critical water systems could be in the hundreds of billions of dollars. Most of these water infrastructures are well developed making it hard for cyberattacks to cause any significant damage, at most, equipment failure can occur causing power outlets to be disrupted for a short time.

Hospitals 
Hospital as an infrastructure is one of the major assets to have been impacted by cyberattacks. These attacks could "directly lead to deaths." The cyberattacks are designed to deny hospital workers access to critical care systems. Recently, there has been a major increase of cyberattacks against hospitals amid the COVID-19 pandemic. Hackers lock up a network and demand ransom to return access to these systems. The ICRC and other human rights group have urged law enforcement to take “immediate and decisive action” to punish such cyberattackers.

See also 

 Asset (computing)
 Common Vulnerabilities and Exposures
 Computer emergency response team
 Computer insecurity
 Computer security
 Contingency plan
 Countermeasure (computer)
 Exploit (computer security)
 Factor Analysis of Information Risk
 Hacking: The Art of Exploitation Second Edition
 Internet Engineering Task Force
 Information technology security audit
 Information Security
 Intrusion detection system
 IT risk
 List of cyber warfare forces
 Metasploit
 Month of Bugs
 National Information Assurance Glossary
 Network lateral movement
 Penetration test
 Risk factor
 Security control
 Security service (telecommunication)
 Threat
 Vulnerability
 Vulnerability management
 Web application attack and audit framework (w3af)
 List of cyberattacks
 Access control
 Security controls
 Security management

References 

 Sanaei, M. G., Isnin, I. F., & Bakhtiari, M. (2013). Performance Evaluation of Routing Protocol on AODV and DSR Under Wormhole Attack. International Journal of Computer Networks and Communications Security, Volume 1, Issue 1, .

Further reading

External links

 July 2015 Cyber Attacks Statistics – Hackmageddon
 Norse Attack Map
 Term in FISMApedia

 
Cybercrime
Attacks by method
Security compliance
Wikipedia articles with ASCII art